International Arbitration and Mediation Centre (IAMC) as proposed by the International Arbitration and Mediation Centre Trust is an autonomous body which was inaugurated in Hyderabad by Chief Justice of India NV Ramana and Telangana Chief Minister K. Chandrasekhar Rao. It is fourth centre of its kind after ones in  Dubai, London and Singapore. The institution acts as mediator or arbitrator for contract value of more than 30 million Indian rupees (393,000 USD) in case of dispute involving any entity owned or managed by Government of Telangana.

Objective 

International Arbitration and Mediation Centre was started in Hyderabad as an arbitration and mediation centre as proposed by the International Arbitration and Mediation Centre Trust for resolving commercial disputes and between Government of Telangana and common public.

Pre-Requisite for Mediation 

Any ministry,public sector company, department, or any entity controlled or managed by the government of Telangana with a contract value of more than 30 million INR (USD393,000) can request for arbitration/mediation with the institution

Location
The facility is being constructed behind IKEA and in proximity to the IT hub.

Trustees 

The trustees of the Institution's board will include Telangana Law ministers,senior judges and other eminent people who will ensure policy level execution apart from regularly amending the policies.

Members 

International Arbitration and Mediation Centre operations is managed by a professional Secretary with the support from qualified staff.  Many famous persons from legal profession, experts and veterans in commerce industry with specialised in arbitration and mediation field both from India and abroad will form the Governing council of the institution.

See also 
 Dispute resolution
 Singapore International Mediation Centre
 New Delhi International Arbitration Centre
 Hong Kong International Arbitration Centre
 London Court of International Arbitration

References

External links 

 Official Website
 Official Website

Dispute resolution
Quasi-judicial bodies of India
Legal organisations based in India
Arbitration organizations
Non-profit organisations based in India
Mediation